Ambalathara may refer to:

 Ambalathara, a village in Kasaragod district in the state of Kerala, India
 Ambalathara, Thiruvananthapuram, a suburb of Thiruvananthapuram, the capital of Kerala, India